Gudbjerg is a town located on the island of Funen in south-central Denmark, in Svendborg Municipality.

Notable people 
 Lene Lund Høy Karlsen (born 1979 in Gudbjerg) a Danish former handball player who lastly played in Viborg HK

References 

Cities and towns in the Region of Southern Denmark
Svendborg Municipality